Alli mia fora… (Greek: Άλλη μια φορά…) is the name of a studio album by popular Greek singer Marinella. It was released on 6 October 1976 by PolyGram Records in Greece, but the album was quickly withdrawn and re-release in 1991 with a new cover pasted over the original. The reason why the album was taken off the market was because the impact of the previous album, Marinella & Kostas Hatzis – Recital, was so great, that Marinella decided that it would be inappropriate to release another album that would resemble with the genre of Recital.

Track listing 
Side One.
 "Tha tragoudiso" (Θα τραγουδήσω; I will sing) – (Tolis Voskopoulos – Mimis Theiopoulos) – 2:51
 A second studio version of this song had been recorded in 1977 and appears on Marinella & Athenians.
 "Afise me na s' agapo" (Άφησέ με να σ' αγαπώ; Let me love you) – (Stelios Zafeiriou – Mimis Theiopoulos) – 3:08
 A second studio version of this song had been recorded in 1977 and appears on Marinella & Athenians.
 "Meta apo tosa chronia chorismo" (Μετά από τόσα χρόνια χωρισμό; After many years of separation) – (Nini Zaha) – 3:19
 "Sto voria, sto notia" (Στο βοριά, στο νοτιά; In the north, in the south) – (Teris Ieremias – Mimis Theiopoulos) – 2:12
 "Tora pou se chano s' agapao"  (Τώρα που σε χάνω σ' αγαπάω; I love you now that I'm losing you) – (Stelios Zafeiriou – Sotia Tsotou) – 2:47
 "S' agapo" (Σ' αγαπώ; I love you) – (Nini Zaha) – 2:31
Side Two.
 "Tora tipota" (Τώρα τίποτα; Now, nothing) – (Tolis Voskopoulos – Mimis Theiopoulos) – 4:25
 A second studio version of this song had been recorded in 1977 and appears on Marinella & Athenians.
 "To parathyro klisto" (Το παράθυρο κλειστό; The window is closed) – (Teris Ieremias – Mimis Theiopoulos) – 2:41
 "Oli nichta agapiomaste" (Όλη νύχτα αγαπιόμαστε; All night we're loving) – (Tolis Voskopoulos – Mimis Theiopoulos) – 2:25
 After album's withdrawal, this song had been re-released on compilation Marinella – 14 Apo Ta Oraiotera Tragoudia Mou.
 "Chameni" (Χαμένη; Lost) – (Nini Zaha) – 3:00
 "Se yirevo" (Σε γυρεύω; I'm looking for you) – (Stelios Zafeiriou – Philippos Nikolaou) – 3:36
 "Alli mia fora" (Άλλη μια φορά; Once again) – (Teris Ieremias – Mimis Theiopoulos) – 4:18

Personnel 
 Marinella – vocals, background vocals
 Philippos Papatheodorou – producer
 Kostas Klavvas – arranger, conductor
 Yiannis Smyrneos – recording engineer

References

1976 albums
Greek-language albums
Marinella albums
Universal Music Greece albums